The Drum Chord Theory is the debut solo studio album by musician Matt Martians, member of groups and sub-groups The Internet, Odd Future, The Jet Age of Tomorrow, The Super D3shay, and Sweaty Martians. It was released on January 27, 2017 by Three Quarters Records.

Background
Following the release of Ego Death, Syd and Matt Martians announced that they would release solo projects before making new music with The Internet. When describing the music that would be on the album, Martians said that it was "very weird and wonky but it’s very chord-heavy and melodic". He also stated that the themes presented on the album, such as uncertainties and ideals about love, come together to tell a story, essentially making it a concept album. "It's really an album that tells a story… It's a guy, he's having problems with a girl. Then he takes some acid," he explained in an interview.

The first half of the album has been described as a smooth and jazzy neo soul production, before a more psychedelic approach to this sound in the latter half. On the album's sound, Martians said "I got the sounds from it years ago when I started taking acid—just taking myself through the journey of being one with myself and being able to sit down and make an album because making an album is very hard. It takes a lot of things out of you emotionally". Although the album is a solo effort, longtime collaborators and friends, including Syd, Tyler, The Creator, and Steve Lacy, make contributions to some songs.

Track listing

Notes
 "Diamond in da Ruff" contains hidden track "Feelin" (prod. by KiNTaRO and Steve Lacy)

References

Matt Martians albums
2017 albums
Albums produced by Steve Lacy